Senator Ray may refer to:

Benjamin Ray (1819–?), New York State Senate
Bill Ray (politician) (1922–2013), Alaska State Senate
James B. Ray (1794–1848), Indiana State Senate
Lyman Beecher Ray (1831–1916), Illinois State Senate
Patricia Torres Ray (born 1964), Minnesota State Senate
Roy Ray (born 1939), Ohio State Senate
William McCrary Ray II (born 1963), Georgia State Senate
Kevin Raye (born 1961), Maine State Senate